Michael E. Miller (born August 14, 1964) is an American basketball coach who is an assistant coach for the Washington Wizards of the National Basketball Association (NBA).

Early life
Miller was born on August 14, 1964, in Monmouth, Illinois, and graduated from Monmouth High School. He played college basketball at Burlington Junior College (now Southeastern Community College) in Burlington, Iowa and East Texas State University (now Texas A&M University–Commerce). At East Texas State, he was a member of the team that won the Lone Star Conference championship in 1984. He graduated from East Texas State in 1987.

Coaching career

Early coaching career (1987–1994)
Miller began his coaching career as an assistant coach Cistercian Prep School in Irving, Texas in 1987.  He was an assistant Football and Baseball coach, and the Head Coach of the JV Basketball team his first year.  The next year, he was head coach of the Varsity Basketball team, and left the following year to join the college ranks as an assistant at Western Illinois University, where he coached from 1989–90. The following season, Miller was an assistant coach at Sam Houston State.

From 1991 to 1994, Miller was an assistant coach at Southwest Texas State (now Texas State) under Jim Wooldridge, where he helped Southwest Texas State achieve an NCAA tournament appearance and school record 25 wins in the 1993–94 season.

Southwest Texas State (1994–2000)
At age 29, Miller was promoted as head coach at Southwest Texas State in 1994 and was the second youngest NCAA Division I head coach that year. As head coach, Miller led Southwest Texas State to the Southland Conference regular season and conference tournament titles and an NCAA tournament appearance in 1996–97, for which he won Coach of the Year honors from the Southland. Southwest Texas State finished second in the Southland standings in 1997–98 and won another regular season title in 1998–99. Miller also coached center/power forward Jeff Foster, who would be a first round 1999 NBA draft selection and play his entire 13-season career with the Indiana Pacers. In six seasons as head coach at Southwest Texas State, Miller had an 87–79 record.

Later college coaching career (2000–2013)
In 2000, Miller reunited with Wooldridge, this time as associate head coach at Kansas State, where he would remain for five seasons.

Miller had his second head coaching job at Eastern Illinois from 2005 to 2012, during which he went 75–130. His only winning season there was in 2009–10 when Eastern Illinois went 19–12. Following a 12–17 season, Eastern Illinois decided on February 27, 2012 not to renew Miller's contract that was to expire April 30.

In 2012–13, Miller was an assistant at UC Riverside, for his third assistant coaching job under Wooldridge.

Professional coaching career (2013–present)
In October 2013, Miller was named an assistant coach at the Austin Toros of the NBA D-League (now G League).

On October 7, 2015, the D-League's Westchester Knicks hired him to be their head coach. While with the Knicks, Miller won the NBA G League Coach of the Year for the 2017–18 season. After four seasons in Westchester, during which he went 108–92, Miller was promoted to the New York Knicks as an assistant coach.

Miller was named the Knicks interim head coach on December 6, 2019.

He joined the Oklahoma City Thunder as an assistant coach for the 2020–21 season, later joining the Washington Wizards in the same role the following season.

Head coaching record

College

NBA D-League/G League

|-
| style="text-align:left;"|Westchester
| style="text-align:left;"|2015–16
| 50||28||22|||| style="text-align:center;"|2nd in Atlantic||2||0||2|||| style="text-align:center;"|Lost Quarterfinals
|-
| style="text-align:left;"|Westchester
| style="text-align:left;"|2016–17
| 50||19||31|||| style="text-align:center;"|T–3rd in Atlantic||–||–||–||–|| style="text-align:center;"|Missed Playoffs
|-
| style="text-align:left;"|Westchester
| style="text-align:left;"|2017–18
| 50||32||18|||| style="text-align:center;"|1st in Atlantic||1||0||1|||| style="text-align:center;"|Lost Semifinals
|-
| style="text-align:left;"|Westchester
| style="text-align:left;"|2018–19
| 50||29||21|||| style="text-align:center;"|T–2nd in Atlantic||2||1||1|||| style="text-align:center;"|Lost Semifinals
|- class="sortbottom"
| style="text-align:center;" colspan="2"|Career
| 200||108||92|||| ||5||1||4||||

NBA

|-
| style="text-align:left;"|New York
| style="text-align:left;"|
| 44||17||27|||| style="text-align:center;"|5th in Atlantic||—||—||—||—|| style="text-align:center;"|Missed Playoffs
|- class="sortbottom"
| style="text-align:center;" colspan="2"|Career
| 44||17||27|||| ||–||–||–||||

References

1964 births
Living people
American men's basketball coaches
American men's basketball players
Austin Spurs coaches
Austin Toros coaches
Basketball coaches from Illinois
Basketball players from Illinois
College men's basketball head coaches in the United States
Eastern Illinois Panthers men's basketball coaches
Kansas State Wildcats men's basketball coaches
New York Knicks assistant coaches
New York Knicks head coaches
Oklahoma City Thunder assistant coaches
People from Monmouth, Illinois
Place of birth missing (living people)
Sam Houston Bearkats men's basketball coaches
Southeastern Blackhawks men's basketball players
Texas A&M–Commerce Lions men's basketball players
Texas State Bobcats men's basketball coaches
UC Riverside Highlanders men's basketball coaches
Washington Wizards assistant coaches
Westchester Knicks coaches
Western Illinois Leathernecks men's basketball coaches